Alhaji Karim Ayinla Babalola "KAB" Olowu  (OON) (7 June 1924 – 14 August 2019) was a Nigerian sprinter and long jumper who was part of Nigeria's first delegation to the Olympic Games and the Commonwealth Games.

Olowu participated in the 1952 Summer Olympics and in the 1956 Summer Olympics. Two years prior to his appearance at the Olympics, he participated in the 1950 British Empire Games (now the Commonwealth Games) in Auckland, New Zealand. At the 1954 British Empire and Commonwealth Games held in Canada, he won silver medals in long jump and the 4×110 yards relay, becoming the first Nigerian athlete to win two medals at the Commonwealth Games. At the 1992 Barcelona Olympics he became the first Nigerian Olympic torch bearer. He was one of Africa's oldest living Olympians.

Early life
Olowu was born in Lagos, Nigeria on 7 June 1924 to B. M. S. Olowu and R. A. Olowu (née Tinubu). He is the first grandson of Madam Tinubu and Saka Tinubu,  part of a wealthy Yoruba family. He attended Saint Paul's Primary School, Breadfruit Lagos where in 1936 he began his sporting career represented his school in the Empire Day Athletics in commemoration of the British Empire Day, which was celebrated in Britain and its colonies before the independence in 1960. He later attended CMS Grammar School, Lagos where he was the sports prefect (Prefectus Ludorum). He started working as a civil servant before he won a Federal Government scholarship to study Physical Education in Loughborough College Leicestershire, England in 1952. He graduated with honors in 1955

Athletic career
Olowu was among the first group of Nigerians to participate in the Olympic Games. He represented the country twice at the Olympics in 1952 and 1956 respectively in long jump and relay race. He also took part in the Commonwealth Games of 1950, 1954 and 1958. He won silver medals in the long jump and sprint relay at the 1958 edition.

Athletics official
Olowu served in athletics in many other capacities. He was a prominent member of the Athletics Federation of Nigeria (AFN) for several years. He was an official at the 8th Commonwealth Games in Kingston, Jamaica in 1966. He was the Nigerian team manager to the 1976 Summer Olympics, Montréal, Canada.  All the African countries eventually boycotted the Canada games because of the presence of the then apartheid South Africa at the games. He served as the Chairman, Lagos State Sports Council. He was the chief starter at the 1973 All-Africa Games held in Lagos, Nigeria. He also served as captain and as a coach of the national teams at various times.

Later life
After he retired from his athletics career, Olowu worked in the Nigerian Prison system but his love for sports was never far behind. He set up the sports complex at the Nigerian Prison in Kirikiri, Lagos where he worked for some years and set up the then Prisons Athletics club which produced many athletes for Nigeria. Olowu was married to Aminat Olowu (née Abina) until her death. He was the Chairman of the Olowu descendants Union and he was also the head of the Tinubu Family. He had many children, grandchildren and great grandchildren. Olowu died on 14 August 2019 at his daughters family hospital and was buried the next day according to Muslim rites.

Recognition
 The Nigerian Olympic Committee Inc Award (1995)
 Ten years merit award from the Athletic Federation of Nigeria AFN (1996)
 National Sports Award (1987)
 OGS Merit Awards for contribution and service to CMS Grammar School in particular and Nigeria as a federation (2003)
 Special awards and meritorious service to the development of sports in Nigeria by Football College(2001)
 Officer of the Order of Niger (OON) (2006)

References

1924 births
2019 deaths
Sportspeople from Lagos
Nigerian male sprinters
Nigerian male long jumpers
Athletics (track and field) officials
Olympic athletes of Nigeria
Athletes (track and field) at the 1952 Summer Olympics
Athletes (track and field) at the 1956 Summer Olympics
Commonwealth Games silver medallists for Nigeria
Commonwealth Games medallists in athletics
Athletes (track and field) at the 1950 British Empire Games
Athletes (track and field) at the 1954 British Empire and Commonwealth Games
Athletes (track and field) at the 1958 British Empire and Commonwealth Games
Officers of the Order of the Niger
Yoruba sportspeople
CMS Grammar School, Lagos alumni
Medallists at the 1954 British Empire and Commonwealth Games